Paracraga is a genus of moths of the family Dalceridae.

Species
 Paracraga amianta Dyar, 1909
 Paracraga argentea Schaus, 1910
 Paracraga canalicula Dognin, 1910
 Paracraga halophora Dyar, 1928
 Paracraga innocens Schaus, 1905
 Paracraga necoda Druce, 1901
 Paracraga pulverina Schaus, 1920

Former species
 Paracraga cyclophera Dyar, 1914

References

Dalceridae
Zygaenoidea genera